Empedrado is a city in Corrientes Province, Argentina.

It is the capital of the Empedrado Department.

See also

Empedrado (disambiguation)

External links
 
 Municipal website

Populated places in Corrientes Province
Cities in Argentina
Argentina
Corrientes Province